Schizolaena cavacoana is a tree in the family Sarcolaenaceae. It is endemic to Madagascar. The specific epithet is for the botanist Alberto Judice Leote Cavaco.

Description
Its subcoriaceous leaves are elliptic to ovate in shape and are coloured grayish brown above and chocolate brown below. The inflorescences have 10 to 20 flowers, each with five petals.

Distribution and habitat
Schizolaena cavacoana is known only from the northeastern regions of Sava and Analanjirofo. Its habitat is humid forest to  altitude.

References

cavacoana
Endemic flora of Madagascar
Trees of Madagascar
Plants described in 1999